S M Abul Kalam Azad (born April 30, 1967) is a two star Admiral of Bangladesh and incumbent high commissioner of Bangladesh to Maldives. He is former Commander of Bangladesh Navy Fleet. Earlier he held a range of salient appointments, namely Chairman of Chittagong Port Authority, Chairman of Mongla port Authority, Director of Naval Intelligence & Naval Administrative Authority Dhaka.

Early life and education
Sheikh Muhammad Abul Kalam Azad was born in Mohendrapur village of Kumarkhali Upazila of Kushtia District on April 30, 1967. He is the youngest son of late Sheikh Osman Gani and Khadeza Begum.
He is an alumnus of Pabna Cadet College of 1st batch.

Military training
He joined Bangladesh Navy in January 1985 as an officer cadet and was commissioned in executive branch on July 1, 1987. During his career, Rear Admiral Azad went through various education and training courses both at home and abroad. Namely, he completed his International Sub Lieutenant Course (ISLC) in Britannia Royal Naval College, Dartmouth, Devon, England and finished his initial staff course from Royal Naval College, Greenwich, London.

He went to Army Language School in Istanbul, Turkey in 1996 for a Turkish language course and also did a gunnery specialization course from theNaval Training Centre in Istanbul.

Admiral Azad successfully completed his command and staff course at the session 1999–2000 from Defence services command and staff college, Mirpur, Dhaka, Bangladesh. And also is an alumnus of National Defence College, Mirpur.  Furthermore, he completed an International humanitarian law course in Hyderabad, India. He also got the opportunity to attend The Executive Decision Making Course from Naval Postgraduate School, Monterey, California, United States.

Military career
Being a successful gunner, Admiral Azad commanded almost all types of ships and establishments. His sea command includes two frigates,. BNS Umar Farooq and BNS Osman. The two frigates are the first ever frigate and the  first ever guided missile frigate of the Bangladesh Navy. The admiral also commanded two OPVs, BNS Sangu and BNS Madhumati,  and also one small patrol craft, BNS Tamjid. The Admiral's shore commands have included two major naval bases of the Bangladesh Navy, BNS Titumir & BNS Issa Khan.

His key staff appointment includes Staff Officer of Naval Training (SOT), Staff officer operations (SOO) of Commander Khulna Naval area and Officer-in- Charge of field intelligence staff (FIS), Khulna. Being a specialized gunnery officer the Admiral was also the officer in charge of Gunnery School, BNS Isa Khan. In 23 February 2022, he appointed as the high commissioner of Maldives.

References 

1967 births
Living people
People from Kushtia District
Bangladeshi Navy admirals
Bangladesh Navy personnel
High Commissioners of Bangladesh to the Maldives
Graduates of the Royal Naval College, Greenwich
Graduates of Britannia Royal Naval College
Naval Postgraduate School alumni
Pabna Cadet College alumni